Khoplang is a village development committee in Gorkha District in the Gandaki Zone of northern-central Nepal. At the time of the 1991 Nepal census it had a population of 5,227 and had 1054 houses in the town. Former Prime Minister of Nepal Baburam Bhattarai was born here.

References

Populated places in Gorkha District